David Thoreau Wieck (1921–1997) was an American activist and philosophy professor.

Career 

David Thoreau Wieck was born on December 13, 1921. His father, Edward A. Wieck, worked for the Russell Sage Foundation and wrote about miners' associations. David later wrote a biography of his mother, Agnes Burns Wieck.

Wieck began publishing anarchist and antiwar articles in 1938 and was a conscientious objector during World War II. He published A Field of Broken Stones with another conscientious objector, Lowell Naeve, about their time in prison. After the war, Wieck edited Resistance with Paul Goodman. Weick also edited the anarcho-pacifist journal Liberation. He was lifelong friends with fellow pacifist activist David Dellinger. Both were imprisoned in Federal Correctional Institution, Danbury, as conscientious objectors and protested its racial segregrationist policies.

He became a philosophy professor at Rensselaer Polytechnic Institute in Troy, New York.

His translation of Giovanni Baldelli's Social Anarchism sustained Howard Ehrlich's journal Social Anarchism for many years. Wieck had translated the volume from Italian but soon after its printing, the publisher went bankrupt and the books were not sold until they were offered to Wieck a decade later as part of liquidating the publisher's assets. Ehrlich offered the book to encourage subscriptions. Wieck also presented at the Boston 1979 Sacco and Vanzetti conference. He died July 1, 1997.

Selected works 

 A Field of Broken Stones
 Woman from Spillertown: A Memoir of Agnes Burns Wieck (1992)

References

Further reading

External links 

 David Wieck papers and archives

1921 births
1997 deaths
American anarchists
American pacifists